The MDIS & Partners Festival of Golf was a men's senior (over 50) professional golf tournament on the European Seniors Tour, held at the Donald Steel designed Mill Ride Golf Club, near Ascot, Berkshire, England. It was held just once, in May 1999, and was won by David Oakley who finished six shots ahead of Jerry Bruner and David Huish. The total prize fund was €110,000 with the winner receiving €15,950.

Winners

References

External links
Coverage on the European Senior Tour's official site

Former European Senior Tour events
Golf tournaments in England